Wajo Regency is a regency in South Sulawesi Province of Indonesia. It covers an area of 2,506.19 km2 and had a population of 384,694 at the 2010 Census, and 379,079 at the 2020 Census; the official estimate as at mid 2021 was 379,396. Established in 1959,
Wajo Regency has its seat of government (capital) in Sengkang.

History 

The modern Wajo Regency was established in 1959, covering the land area of the former Kingdom of Wajoq.

Administration 
The Wajo Regency in 2022 (as in 2010) comprises fourteen administrative Districts (Kecamatan), tabulated below with their areas and their populations at the 2010 Census and the 2020 Census, together with the official estimates as at mid 2021. The table also includes the location of the district administrative centres, the number of administrative villages (rural desa and urban kelurahan) in each district, and its post code.

Note: (a) except the village of Lepangeng, which has a post code of 90913.

References 

Regencies of South Sulawesi